Zubrin may refer to:

Zubrin, a brand name for the drug tepoxalin
Robert Zubrin (born 1952), American aerospace engineer and author